April Lady is a Regency romance novel by Georgette Heyer. It is in many respects a classic example of her work: light, with some drama and delicately handled romance. Heyer writes from the perspective of two main characters throughout the book. The story is set in 1813.

Plot 

April Lady is the story of Nell or Helen Cardross (née Irvine), the beautiful young wife of the Earl of Cardross. She is of a "good family," one that is accepted by high society, but nonetheless her father and brother spend freely and the family is known to be impoverished. Cardross, on the other hand, is significantly older and has been out in society for some time. Rich and handsome, he could have his pick of the season's débutantes. He falls for Nell on sight and, in spite of the warnings of his friends who are concerned about the gambling habits of her family, he proposes to her at once.

Nell's mother, who has "more hair than wit", tells Nell that Cardross wants an heir and wishes to marry into a good family. She also tells her that she must be a conformable wife and not trouble Cardross. Consequently, Nell, who fell for her husband in the same instant he fell for her, keeps him at arm's length and spends a lot of money until he starts to doubt her affection.

The couple dance at this misunderstanding for many months, ably assisted by Cardross' half-sister, her fiancé Jeremy, Nell's brother Dysart, and Cardross' cousin Felix. Cardross realizes that Nell was innocent and had not stolen his jewels. It had been his sister as she was about to elope and needed money. Jeremy brought her back and Cardross consented to their marriage. Cardross learns that Felix and Nell were just friends and he tells Nell that he had no mistress. He paid Dysart's debts though he hated his gambling. Everything ends well as Cardross and Nell tell each other their feelings.

Characters

 Miss Helen (Nell) Irvine - The heroine, daughter of the late Viscount Pevensey

 Giles Merion, Earl of Cardross - The hero, 30+, lives in Grosvenor Square, country estate is Merion

 Dysart Irvine, Viscount Pevensley - The heroine's brother, a member of the Beggars Club

 Mr Felix Hethersett - Cousin of Lord Cardross

 Lady Letitia (Letty) Merion - Lord Cardross's half-sister, an heiress

 Mrs Thorne - Letitia's aunt

 Mr Jeremy Allendale - An aspiring diplomat, about to take up a position in the court of the Regent of Portugal in Brazil

 Lady Chudleigh - Aunt of Lord Cardross

 Mr Cornelius (Corny) Fancot - Dysart Irvine's friend, and fellow member of the Beggars Club

 Lady Orsett - Lord Cardross' mistress

References

1957 British novels
Novels by Georgette Heyer
Historical novels
Fiction set in 1813
Heinemann (publisher) books
Regency romance novels
British romance novels